Verlaine et Rimbaud (English: "Verlaine and Rimbaud") is an album by Léo Ferré. It was released in 1964 by Barclay Records. This album is one of the first studio double albums in popular music history (before Bob Dylan's or Frank Zappa's).

Background
Verlaine et Rimbaud is Ferré's third LP entirely dedicated to a poet, after Baudelaire's Les Fleurs du mal ("Flowers of Evil") in 1957 and Les Chansons d'Aragon ("Songs of Aragon") in 1961. Here, Ferré sets into music 10 poems from Arthur Rimbaud and 14 from Paul Verlaine. He considers their two different kind of poetry as a whole and mixes them in the track listing, to underline their mythical love affair. The way classical music 'soundscape' tastefully fits into tuneful and straightforward songs is something of an achievement here.

Track listing
All songs composed by Léo Ferré.

Original LP

Personnel 
  – backing vocals (uncredited)
 Lionel Gali – violin solo (uncredited)
 Barthélémy Rosso – guitar (uncredited)
 The orchestra consists of session musicians hired for the recording

Credits 
 Jean-Michel Defaye – arranger & orchestra conductor 
 Gerhard Lehner – director of engineering
 Jean Fernandez – executive producer
 Maurice Frot – artwork
 Hubert Grooteclaes – photography
 Léo Ferré - original liner notes

External links 
 Album presentation (French)

Léo Ferré albums
Barclay (record label) albums
French-language albums
1964 albums
Musical settings of poems by Arthur Rimbaud